The Jerusalem Times is a Palestinian newspaper founded by the BILADI Publishing Co. in 1994.

The Jerusalem Times also maintains an internet edition, jerusalem-times.net

Publications established in 1994
Mass media in Jerusalem
Newspapers published in the State of Palestine